Jillian Rose Banks (born June 16, 1988), known mononymously as Banks (often stylized in all caps), is an American singer and songwriter. Following the release of two extended plays, Fall Over and London, in 2013, Banks released her debut album, Goddess, in 2014 to positive reviews from contemporary music critics. It reached number 12 on the US Billboard 200, while its most successful single, "Beggin for Thread", was certified platinum by the Recording Industry Association of America (RIAA). Her second studio album, The Altar, was released in September 2016 to a similar positive reception, becoming her second top 20 album in the United States. Her third album, III, was released in 2019. It became her most critically acclaimed release to date and peaked at number 21 on the Billboard 200, as well as number 3 on the Top Albums Sales chart.

Life and career

Early life and education
Jillian Rose Banks was born on June 16, 1988, in Orange County, California. Banks moved to Los Angeles when she was one or two years old and lived in Tarzana, an affluent neighborhood in the San Fernando Valley. She started writing songs at the age of 15 and taught herself piano when she received a keyboard from a friend to help her through her parents' divorce.  She says she "felt very alone and helpless. I didn't know how to express what I was feeling or who to talk to." She later enrolled to study psychology at the University of Southern California (USC), where she wrote a thesis on the children of divorced parents, eventually earning a bachelor's degree in psychology.

2013–2014: Breakthrough and Goddess

During Banks' time at USC she was put in contact with DJ Yung Skeeter, who offered to manage her and brought her to British label Good Years Recordings. After posting a track called "Before I Ever Met You" on a private SoundCloud page in February 2013, the song ended up being played by DJ Zane Lowe on BBC Radio 1. Banks released her debut extended play (EP), Fall Over, internationally in March 2013 by Good Years Recordings. Billboard called her a "magnetic writer with songs to obsess over." Her second EP, London, was released in September 2013 by Harvest Records and Good Years Recordings to positive reviews from music critics. In an interview after the debut of her first album she posted her phone number on her social media accounts to be closer to her fans and have a more intimate connection to all of them. Her song "Waiting Game" from the EP was featured in the 2013 Victoria's Secret holiday commercial.

In late 2013, she received nominations for awards from both the BBC and MTV. She was nominated for a Sound of... award by the BBC and a Brand New Nominee by MTV. She was included on Shazam's list of "2014 Acts to Watch", as well as on iTunes' list of "New Artists for 2014". Banks was artist of the week for Vogue in August 2013 where they wrote that her songs "perfectly capture a feeling of being lost and powerless in the world." Banks has been tipped by several media outlets as the artist to watch in 2014, including Spin listing London as one of the "50 Albums You Gotta Hear in 2014" and being named as one of the artists under Spotify's Spotlight for 2014. Additional accolades came from The Boston Globe, Fuse, and The Huffington Post.

Banks was the opening act for Canadian singer The Weeknd during his fall 2013 tour, supporting him in both the United States and the United Kingdom. After finishing the tour with The Weeknd, she announced her own tour which began in the United Kingdom during March 2014. Banks was also a featured performer at the Coachella festival, taking place in April 2014, Bonnaroo and Open'er Festival in July 2014. In January 2015, Banks was part of the lineup for the 2015 St. Jerome's Laneway Festival, which toured Adelaide, Auckland, Brisbane, Detroit, Fremantle, Melbourne, Singapore and Sydney. On August 7, 2014, Banks made her television debut on Jimmy Kimmel Live!, performing "Beggin for Thread" and "Waiting Game".

Her debut album, Goddess, was released on September 5, 2014, and charted within the top 20 of several countries, including the UK, Australia, Germany, New Zealand and Sweden. In the US, the album debuted at number 12 on the Billboard 200, selling 25,000 copies in its first week of release. It received positive reviews from critics, who praised her sonic ambition and the album's raw sound. It holds a score of 74 out of 100 on Metacritic. The album was supported by the release of four singles: "Brain", "Goddess", "Drowning", and "Beggin for Thread". "Drowning" peaked at number 48 on Billboards Rock Digital Songs chart, while "Beggin for Thread" reached number 11 on Billboards Alternative Songs chart, and numbers 80 and 64 in Australia and Germany, respectively.

The track "Waiting Game" was featured in the film Divergent, which was released in March 2014. Along with "Waiting Game", "You Should Know Where I'm Coming From" was featured in the October 9, 2014 episode of Grey's Anatomy, while the track "Goddess" was featured in the March 12, 2015 episode. "You Should Know Where I'm Coming From" was also featured on the ninth episode of Red Band Society. Her single "Beggin' for Thread" was featured in the third episode of the second season of The Originals. In June 2017, "Waiting Game" was used in the official trailer for Netflix's psychological thriller series Gypsy.

2015–2017: The Altar

On November 4, 2015, Banks released the single "Better", along with its accompanying music video. Banks toured with The Weeknd for a second time, opening for him on his The Madness Fall Tour across North America from November to December 2015. She announced on June 8, 2016, that she had finished work on her second album.

On July 12, 2016, Banks released "Fuck with Myself" as the lead single from her second studio album, titled The Altar. She premiered the track on Zane Lowe's Beats 1 radio show, where she noted it was the last song she wrote for the album. "There's so many meanings to it", she said of the song. "It could be like, 'I fuck with myself', like, 'I mess with myself more than anybody else.' It could be, 'I fuck with myself', kind of like, 'I'm feeling myself.' It means a lot of different things that I think a lot of people can relate to." In an interview for Noisey, Vices music channel, Banks describes her conflict between self-criticism and self-love as the inspiration behind the track. The song received acclaim from music critics, and reached 29 on the US Rock Songs chart.

The second single from the album, "Gemini Feed", was released on August 2, 2016, and premiered on Annie Mac's BBC Radio 1 show. The song peaked at number 25 on the US Rock Songs chart. The album's third single, "Mind Games", was released on August 19, 2016, followed by "To the Hilt" on September 16, 2016.

The Altar was released on September 30, 2016. The album debuted at number 17 on the US Billboard 200 with 14,220 copies sold in pure album sales, and at number 24 on the UK Albums Chart, selling 3,229 copies in its first week. The album also debuted at number eight in Australia and number 12 in Canada. The album received generally positive reviews from critics; it has a score of 70 on Metacritic.

A music video for "Trainwreck" was released on January 18, 2017. On February 24, 2017, Banks embarked on "The Altar Tour" in support of her sophomore album. It consisted of 68 dates and concluded on November 16, 2017. On April 7, 2017, Banks released the single "Crowded Places", which was featured in the penultimate episode of the HBO series Girls on April 9. Around this time, a collection of unreleased virtual reality experiences called "Three Points to the Recollection of My Future" was produced with Director Jenn Duong. The project was described as "an intense undertaking" that turned "various songs by the singer into a poetic, dance-driven interactive experience, which is an interesting experiment with the music video format."

Another single, titled "Underdog", was released on September 28, 2017. The track was premiered on Lowe's Beats 1 radio show. On November 14, Banks' collaboration with 6lack, "In Between", was unveiled as one of the three new tracks to celebrate the one-year anniversary of 6lack's debut album, Free 6lack. In 2018, "In Between" and "Poltergeist", a track from The Altar, were both featured on the soundtrack of the fifth season of Power.

2019–2020: III
In December 2018, Banks said she was working on an album to be released in 2019. On April 29, 2019, Banks released a new single titled "Gimme". The song debuted as Zane Lowe's World Record on Apple Music's Beats 1. On June 11, 2019, Banks released another single, "Look What You're Doing To Me," featuring Francis and the Lights, which she revealed is about falling and being in love. The final single from the album, "Contaminated", was released on July 10. Her third studio album, III, was released on July 12, 2019. Banks describes the album as her transformation from a naive, hopeful romantic into a wise woman. Banks embarked on The III Tour on September 3 in support of the album.

2021–present: Serpentina

In June 2021, Banks teased a song titled "The Devil" for an upcoming album. Written and produced by Banks, with additional production by Al Shux and Jeff "Gitty" Gitelman, the song and its accompanying music video—co-directed by Banks and Jenna Marsh—were released on June 16, and marked the singer's first release as an independent artist.

On August 25, 2021, Banks released "Skinnydipped" as the second single from her fourth album. The song is about "moving onward, finding her self-worth, and no longer drowning in toxic relationships". Co-directed by Banks and Michael Stine, the music video features the singer in jewellery from Bulgari's "Serpenti" collection, echoing the snake motif "represent[ative] of rebirth and shedding one's skin" used in her imagery.

Banks announced the release of her fourth studio album Serpentina for April 8, 2022.

Public image
Banks' reluctance to use social media is often noted by journalists. Although she has stated she lets her "management run that stuff", the singer did give out her telephone number on her Facebook fanpage. She has since become more active on her Instagram and Twitter accounts.

Artistry
Banks' sound has been described as dark R&B and compared to Ellie Goulding, The Weeknd, and Aaliyah, although she cites Lauryn Hill and Fiona Apple as her biggest influences. She says that music helps her release her emotions and for that reason kept her music private while she earned her bachelor's degree in psychology. Her vocals have frequently been described as "Aaliyah-like", in addition to Billboard noting that "her rhapsodic voice possesses a frail vulnerability and recalls singers like Feist and Erykah Badu."

Musical style
Banks' music has been categorized as alternative pop, alternative R&B, avant-pop, electropop, hip hop, R&B, trap-pop and trip hop.

Bibliography
 Generations of Women from the Moon (2019)

Discography

 Goddess (2014)
 The Altar (2016)
 III (2019)
 Serpentina (2022)

Tours
Headlining
 The Goddess Tour (2014–2015)
 The Altar Tour (2017)
 The III Tour (2019)
 The Serpentina Tour (2022)

Supporting
 The Weeknd – Kiss Land Fall Tour (2013)
 The Weeknd – The Madness Fall Tour (2015)

Awards and nominations

References

External links

 

1988 births
21st-century American women singers
American contemporary R&B singers
American electronic musicians
American women singer-songwriters
American people of English descent
Harvest Records artists
Living people
Musicians from Orange County, California
Singers from Los Angeles
Trip hop musicians
University of Southern California alumni
American women in electronic music
Alternative rock singers
Iamsound Records artists
Singer-songwriters from California